Qaflankuh-e Sharqi Rural District is in Kaghazkonan District of Mianeh County, East Azerbaijan province, Iran. At the National Census of 2006, its population was 3,274 in 911 households. There were 2,744 inhabitants in 884 households at the following census of 2011. At the most recent census of 2016, the population of the rural district was 2,573 in 926 households. The largest of its 19 villages was Allahlu, with 640 people.

References 

Meyaneh County

Rural Districts of East Azerbaijan Province

Populated places in East Azerbaijan Province

Populated places in Meyaneh County